Free Press was the journal of the Campaign for Press and Broadcasting Freedom.

The CPBF published the first edition of its journal Free Press in February 1980.

The final edition (#216) was published in Autumn 2018.

References

Publications established in 1980
Publications disestablished in 2018
Political publications